Joann Condon (born April 1970) is a British actress who has worked in film, television, and the theatre.

Career
Condon is best known for her role as Pat, a member of the Fat Fighters group in the BBC television comedy Little Britain, written by and starring David Walliams and Matt Lucas. The character left the group in the very last episode of the series. Her other  television roles include the recurring characters of Sue Fingers in Edge of Heaven (2014) and Ada in The Halcyon (2017). She portrayed two characters in the long-running hospital drama Casualty, Stella Baker and Fiona Porie. Her other television credits include appearances on The Office and Dad's Army: The Lost Episodes.

Condon starred as the female sumo wrestler Giant Butterfly in the 2000 film Secret Society.  

Condon's stage work includes the role of Gemma Sweeney in  Jonathan Harvey's play Babies (Royal National Theatre / Royal Court Theatre), a work which won the George Devine Award in 1993 and the Evening Standard's Most Promising Playwright Award in 1994. In 2021 she starred in the one woman show Little Boxes, a work she also authored, at the Ludlow Fringe Festival.

References

External links

1970 births
Living people
20th-century British actresses
21st-century British actresses
Alumni of the Academy Drama School
British stage actresses
British television actresses